Dick Brook is small tributary stream of the River Severn that flows through Worcestershire, England.

The brook is formed from two small unnamed streams that converge at Joan’s Hole to the west of Dunley. The longest of these streams drains the area around Rock, with a source near Clows Top. At the edge of the village of Astley it was dammed to power Priors Mill, and then to the south of the village, at New Bridge it is crossed by a packhorse bridge, below the monastery at Glasshampton. To the north of Noutard's Green it passes beneath Glazen Bridge (B4196), and along the northern edge of Shrawley wood, until it joins the River Severn.

A very short section of Dick Brook was canalized about 1717 to enable small boats to travel up stream from the River Severn to Astley Forge. Two flash locks were constructed and the date 1717 is visible on one of these lock chambers.

References

Tributaries of the River Severn
Rivers of Worcestershire
1Dick